Maulana Azad College, formerly Islamia College, is a public institute of liberal arts, commerce and science in India, located in central Kolkata, West Bengal, India. The college is fully government-administered. It is located near the junction of Rafi Ahmed Kidwai Road and SN Banerjee Road, popularly called "Lotus crossing".

It is affiliated to the University of Calcutta. The college also offers numerous courses in languages associated with Muslim culture, such as Urdu, Arabic, and Persian. The college offers both post-graduate (English, Zoology and Urdu) and under-graduate courses in a number of subjects in the three streams of arts, science and commerce. It is accredited an ('A') grade by the National Assessment and Accreditation Council (NAAC). The college has been given the status of 'Centre of Potential for Excellence' by UGC.

History 
Maulana Azad College was founded on 9 December 1926 by Victor Bulwer-Lytton, 2nd Earl of Lytton, then Governor of Bengal. It was originally called Islamia College. The institution was the culmination of efforts of notable Muslim leaders like A. K. Fazlul Huq, then minister of education of Bengal, Syed Nawab Ali Chowdhury and Sir Abdul Rahim. With an objective to promote Islamic learning and general education among the Muslim population in British India and with the sustained efforts of contemporary education minister of Bengal, A. K. Fazlul Haque, on 9 December 1924, Lord Lytton, the contemporary Governor of Bengal laid the foundation stone of Islamia College under the affiliation of University of Calcutta. The first Principal, A. H. Harley, formerly, faculty of Oriental Languages at the University of Edinburgh.

In the 1940, the future founding father of Bangladesh, Sheikh Mujibur Rahman, studied at the college and stayed at the Baker Hostel.

After the Independence of India, the college was renamed to Central Calcutta College and opened admissions to students of all faith. Professor F. J. F. Pereira was made principal of the newly renamed college.

In 1960, the college was renamed to its current name Maulana Azad College in the memory of the Maulana Abul Kalam Azad. In 1990, the college became a co-educational institution. In 1999, Prime Minister Sheikh Hasina of Bangladesh visited the college and the Bangabandhu Memorial Museum at Baker Hostel.

On 23 February 2011, the government of Bangladesh and India installed a bust of Sheikh Mujibur Rahman at the Bangabandhu Memorial Museum at room 23 and 24 of Baker Hostel of the College. The All Bengal Minority Youth Federation demanded the removal of the bust of Sheikh Mujibur Rahman from the museum as they deemed the statue offensive to Islamic sensibilities. The demands were rejected by Mamata Banerjee, chief minister of West Bengal.

Courses

The college offers undergraduate and postgraduate courses in arts, commerce and science in various streams. These are: B.A, B.A (Hons), B.Com. (Hons), B.Sc. (Hons) at UG level. And M.A and M.Sc. at the PG level. The fees are also nominal lying around ₹1,500/year for UG courses and around ₹4,000/year for PG courses.

Admission procedure and cutoffs

The college has an online application process for all its courses. Admission into undergraduate courses are merit-based. While that of postgraduate courses is done by both merit as well as an admission test.

Rankings

Notable alumni
Abdullah al Mahmood, lawyer and politician.
Biman Bose - Chairman West Bengal Left Front, Politburo Member & West Bengal State Secretary of the West Bengal Communist Party of India (Marxist).
Bishnu De- Poet, writer, and film critic. 
Habibullah Bahar Chowdhury, Health Minister of East Pakistan Provincial Assembly. 
Kazi Golam Mahbub, politician. 
Khaleque Nawaz Khan language movement activist who defeated incumbent Prime Minister of the then East Bengal in 1954 Jukto Front election.
K G Mustafa, journalist.
Khuda Buksh, an insurance executive.
M Osman Ali, one of the founders of Awami League.
Mashiur Rahman (politician from Jessore) - ex-minister, member of the parliament, and the highest ranking Awami League leader assassinated by the Pakistani army during the 1971 liberation movement of Bangladesh.
Mohammed Salim (politician) - Ex Lok Sabha MP from Raiganj (Lok Sabha constituency), Politburo Member and senior Communist Party of India (Marxist) (CPI(M)) leader.
Muhammad Mansur Ali - A senior leader of the Awami League and also served as the prime minister of Bangladesh in 1975.
Muhammad Habibar Rahman, chairman of the department of mathematics at the University of Rajshahi and killed in 1971 by Pakistan Army.
Muhammad Shamsul Huq, Vice-Chancellor of the University of Dhaka and Foreign Minister of Bangladesh.
Nafis Ahmad, geographer.
Serajuddin Hossain - prominent Bangladeshi journalist and was the news and executive editor of The Daily Ittefaq.
Sheikh Mujibur Rahman - Founding Father of Bangladesh, its first President and later served as the prime minister of his country.
Sultan Ahmed - Indian politician and the Union Minister of State for Tourism in the Manmohan Singh government.
Syed Altaf Hossain, Minister of Railways of Bangladesh.
Syed Azizul Huq, member of parliament of Bangladesh.
Tofail Ahmed, researcher of folk arts.
Taradas Bandyopadhyay - Son of Bengali author Bibhutibhushan Bandyopadhyay, wrote number of short stories and novels like Kaal Nirabadhi, Saptarshir Alo, Kakkhopath. Most notable among them was his contribution to Taranath Tantrik.
Wahiduzzaman, politician and minister of commerce of Pakistan.
Zahur Ahmad Chowdhury, Minister of Health and Family Welfare.

Notable faculty 

 Itrat Husain Zuberi, professor of English and future Vice-Chancellor of the University of Rajshahi.

See also 
List of colleges affiliated to the University of Calcutta
Education in India
Education in West Bengal

References

External links
Maulana Azad College

Universities and colleges in Kolkata
University of Calcutta affiliates
Educational institutions established in 1926
Memorials to Abul Kalam Azad
1926 establishments in India